Everyone Will Burn is a 2021 Spanish supernatural horror drama film directed by David Hebrero which stars Macarena Gómez along with Rodolfo Sancho, Ana Milán, and Sofía García.

Plot 
The plot is set in a Spanish village. After ten years of living nightmare caused by the bullying-induced suicide of her son Lolo, María José, otherwise marginalized too by the village's inhabitants, decides to take her life. She is however stopped by Lucía, a mysterious girl with achondroplasia, later revealed to have supernatural abilities, burning a civil guard agent with her sheer gaze. With the girl seemingly related to an apocalyptic prophecy and the mayor's wife as María José's main foe, María José only enjoys some help from an altar server (Juan) among the townsfolks.

Cast

Production 

The screenplay was penned by David Hebrero alongside Javier Kirán, whilst Ona Isart worked as a cinematographer. The film is a Nostalgia Shop Films production. It was shot in locations of the Madrid region and the province of Ávila, including Arévalo and Las Rozas.

Release 
The film had its world premiere on 16 October 2021 at the 54th Sitges Film Festival. Its festival run also included the Bilbao-based FANT Festival and the London-based Arrow FrightFest. It was selected in the 2022 Fantastic Fest's film slate for its North-American premiere.

References 

Films set in Spain
Films shot in the Community of Madrid
Films shot in the province of Ávila
Spanish supernatural horror films
2021 horror films
2020s Spanish-language films
2020s Spanish films
2020s horror drama films
2020s supernatural horror films